Katherine D. Crothall is an American laser scientist and businesswoman. She is a director of University City Science Center, Pharmitas, Adhezion BioMedical, Xanitos, Inc, and Kimmel Center of Performing Arts. She is an overseer at the School of Engineering and Applied Sciences at the University of Pennsylvania. She has over 25 patents, has authored scientific papers and has given papers at scientific and medical symposiums.

Career

Aspire Bariatrics, LLC (2010 - 2022) 

She was the CEO and president of Aspire Bariatrics which developed a reversible and minimally invasive weight loss solution for people with obesity.

Liberty Venture Partners (2006 - 2010) 

Crothall served as a principal of Liberty Venture Partners, Inc. from 2006 to 2010.

Animas Corporation (1996 - 2006) 

She founded Animas Corporation (NASDAQ: PUMP) in 1996 and served as its president, CEO and chairman from its inception to its acquisition by Johnson & Johnson Corporation (NYSE: JNJ) in February, 2006 for $518 million. Animas is leading manufacturer of insulin infusion pumps located in West Chester, PA.

Luxar Corporation (1988 - 1996) 

From 1988 to 1996, Crothall was president and CEO of the Luxar Corporation (Seattle, WA), which she founded with former Xanar Laser engineers Paul Diaz and Michael Levy in 1988. Luxar manufactured CO2 lasers for cosmetic, oral, dental, and dermatological surgical applications. Luxar was later sold to ESC Medical (NASDAQ: ESCMF) in 1997. Many of Crothall's laser patents are still being used today in LightScalpel's LS-1005 and LS-2010 surgical and dental laser systems.

Laakmann Electro-Optics (1978 - 1986) 

Crothall founded Laakmann Electro-Optics in 1978 and was sold to Johnson & Johnson in 1981. She continued running the company for five years post-acquisition. Laakmann Electro-Optics manufactured CO2 lasers for the medical, aerospace and industrial markets.

Patents 
She holds over 25 patents in the laser, fiber-optic, thermal (infrared) imaging, and glucose sensing fields. Patents include: All-metal RF-excited CO2 lasers (US Pat 4,169,251) and flexible waveguides for CO2 lasers (US Pat 4,652,083).

Awards 
 Kumar Patel Prize in Laser Surgery (2023) - American Laser Study Club
 Iris Newman Award (2009) - Alliance of Women Entrepreneurs
 Mark A. Stevens Distinguished Alumni Award (2008) - University of Southern California
 Greater Philadelphia Raymond Rafferty Entrepreneurial Excellence Award (2004)
 Ernst & Young Entrepreneur of the Year Award (2003)

Academics 
Crothall received a B.S. in Electrical Engineering from the University of Pennsylvania in 1971 and a Master of Science and a Ph.D. in Electrical Engineering from the University of Southern California in 1976.

References

American electrical engineers
USC Viterbi School of Engineering alumni
University of Pennsylvania School of Engineering and Applied Science alumni
Laser researchers
Living people
1949 births
American women chief executives
Optical engineers
Women in optics
21st-century American women